The quarterfinals were two-legged ties determined on aggregate score. The first legs were played on March 20. The return legs were played on March 27. The group winners in each tie, listed as "Team #1", hosted the second leg.

All times are CET (UTC+1).

Game 1

Game 2

External links
Schedule

Quarterfinals